Suavanao Airport is an airport on Santa Isabel Island in the Solomon Islands .

The main destination off this airfield is Honiara, Solomon Island's capital. It has very little traffic, providing one flight a week most of the time, depending on the season. Mainly used by Isabel's inhabitants, it also provides a fast connection to a Papatura Island resort.

The short airstrip is basically a leveled and cleaned up piece of land, surrounded by a dense tropical forest and narrow streams. It is not paved, and can only be used by small regional aircraft like the DHC-6 Twin Otter or Britten-Norman BN-2 Islander of Solomon Airlines. There is a small wooden cabin by the strip, but there's no electricity nor means of communication with the mainland.

Airlines and destinations

External links
Solomon Airlines Routes

Airports in the Solomon Islands